The 1998 Stanley Cup playoffs, the playoff tournament of the National Hockey League (NHL), began on April 22, 1998 following the 1997–98 regular season. The sixteen teams that qualified, eight from each conference, played best-of-7 series for conference quarterfinals, semifinals and championships, and then the conference champions  played a best-of-7 series for the Stanley Cup.

The playoffs concluded on June 16 with the Detroit Red Wings defeating the Washington Capitals in a four-game sweep to win their second Stanley Cup championship in a row. Red Wings captain Steve Yzerman was named playoff MVP, and awarded the Conn Smythe Trophy. The 1997–98 Detroit Red Wings were the last team to defend their Stanley Cup title until the Pittsburgh Penguins successfully defended their Stanley Cup title in 2017.

In the Eastern Semis, the Buffalo Sabres made history as they became the first team in NHL history to complete a four-game sweep of the Montreal Canadiens on Montreal ice.

For the first time since 1969, the Chicago Blackhawks missed the playoffs. Also, both the Islanders and Rangers missed the playoffs in the same season for the first time.

Playoff seeds

The following teams qualified for the playoffs:

Eastern Conference
 New Jersey Devils, Atlantic Division champions, Eastern Conference regular season champions – 107 points
 Pittsburgh Penguins, Northeast Division champions – 98 points
 Philadelphia Flyers – 95 points
 Washington Capitals – 92 points
 Boston Bruins – 91 points
 Buffalo Sabres – 89 points
 Montreal Canadiens – 87 points
 Ottawa Senators – 83 points

Western Conference
 Dallas Stars, Central Division champions, Western Conference regular season champions, Presidents' Trophy winners – 109 points
 Colorado Avalanche, Pacific Division champions – 95 points
 Detroit Red Wings – 103 points
 St. Louis Blues – 98 points
 Los Angeles Kings – 87 points
 Phoenix Coyotes – 82 points
 Edmonton Oilers – 80 points
 San Jose Sharks – 78 points

Playoff bracket

Conference Quarterfinals

Eastern Conference Quarterfinals

(1) New Jersey Devils vs. (8) Ottawa Senators

This was the first playoff meeting between these two teams.

(2) Pittsburgh Penguins vs. (7) Montreal Canadiens

This was the first playoff meeting between these two teams.

(3) Philadelphia Flyers vs. (6) Buffalo Sabres

This was the second consecutive and fifth overall playoff meeting between these two teams; with Philadelphia winning all four previous series. Philadelphia won last year's Eastern Conference Semifinals in five games.

(4) Washington Capitals vs. (5) Boston Bruins

This was the second playoff meeting between these two teams. Their only previous meeting was in the 1990 Prince of Wales Conference Final, where Boston won in a four-game sweep.

Western Conference Quarterfinals

(1) Dallas Stars vs. (8) San Jose Sharks

This was the first playoff meeting between these two teams.

(2) Colorado Avalanche vs. (7) Edmonton Oilers

This was the second consecutive playoff meeting and second postseason match-up between these two teams. Colorado won last year's Western Conference Semifinals in five games.

(3) Detroit Red Wings vs. (6) Phoenix Coyotes

This was the second playoff meeting between these two teams. Their only previous meeting was in the 1996 Western Conference Quarterfinals where Detroit defeated the Winnipeg Jets in six games.

(4) St. Louis Blues vs. (5) Los Angeles Kings

This was the second playoff meeting between these two teams. Their only previous meeting was in the 1969 Stanley Cup Semifinals, where St. Louis won in a four-game sweep.

Game four was the last playoff game at the Great Western Forum.

Conference Semifinals

Eastern Conference Semifinals

(4) Washington Capitals vs. (8) Ottawa Senators

This was the first playoff meeting between these two teams.

(6) Buffalo Sabres vs. (7) Montreal Canadiens

This was the seventh playoff meeting between these two teams; with Montreal winning four of the six previous series. They last met in the 1993 Adams Division Finals, where Montreal won in a four-game sweep.

Western Conference Semifinals

(1) Dallas Stars vs. (7) Edmonton Oilers

This was the second consecutive playoff meeting and the fourth overall playoff match-up between these two teams; with Edmonton winning two of the three previous series. Edmonton won last year's Western Conference Quarterfinals in seven games.

(3) Detroit Red Wings vs. (4) St. Louis Blues

This was the third consecutive playoff meeting and the sixth overall playoff match-up between these two teams; with Detroit winning three of the five previous series. Detroit won last year's Western Conference Quarterfinals in six games.

Conference Finals

Eastern Conference Final

(4) Washington Capitals vs. (6) Buffalo Sabres

This was the first playoff meeting between these two teams. Washington made their second Conference Finals appearance; they last made it to the Conference Finals in 1990 where they lost to the Boston Bruins in a four-game sweep. This was the first conference final for Buffalo since the playoffs went to a conference format starting in 1982. Buffalo last played a semifinal series in 1980 where they lost to the New York Islanders in six games. These teams split their four-game regular season series.

Western Conference Final

(1) Dallas Stars vs. (3) Detroit Red Wings

This was the third playoff meeting between these two teams; with Detroit winning both previous series. They last met in the 1995 Western Conference Quarterfinals, where Detroit won in five games. Dallas made their third appearance in the Conference Finals. They last made it to the Conference Finals in 1991, where the Minnesota North Stars defeated the Edmonton Oilers in five games. Detroit made their fourth consecutive and sixth overall appearance in the Conference Finals; they defeated the Colorado Avalanche in the previous year in six games. Detroit won this year's five-game regular season series earning eight of ten points.

Stanley Cup Finals

This was the first and to date only playoff meeting between these two teams. Detroit made their twenty-first and second consecutive Finals appearance, while Washington made their first Finals appearance in their twenty-fourth season. Until 2017 this was the last time that the Stanley Cup was successfully defended by the previous year's champion. This remains the last time there was a sweep in the Finals.

Playoff statistics

Skaters
These are the top ten skaters based on points.

Goaltenders
This is a combined table of the top five goaltenders based on goals against average and the top five goaltenders based on save percentage, with at least 420 minutes played. The table is sorted by GAA, and the criteria for inclusion are bolded.

See also
 1997–98 NHL season

References

Stanley Cup playoffs
play